Eindawya Pagoda is a Buddhist stupa located in Mandalay, Myanmar. It was built by King Pagan Min in 1847, on the site of his residence before he ascended the throne; gilt from top to bottom; a shrine of fine proportions. The pagoda was built on the site of Pagan Min's summer house, when he was a prince.

Gallery

Notes

References

Pagodas in Myanmar
Buddhist temples in Mandalay
19th-century Buddhist temples
Religious buildings and structures completed in 1847
1847 establishments in Burma